The 1938 Dartmouth Indians football team represented Dartmouth College in the 1938 college football season. The Indians were led by fifth-year head coach Earl Blaik and played their home games at Memorial Field in Hanover, New Hampshire. The Indians finished with a record of 7–2, finishing No. 20 in the final AP Poll. Their loss on the road to rival Cornell snapped a 22-game unbeaten streak.

Schedule

References

Dartmouth
Dartmouth Big Green football seasons
Dartmouth Indians football